Jae-seop, also spelled Jae-sup or Jae-sub, is a Korean masculine given name. Its meaning depends on the hanja used to write each syllable of the name.

Hanja and meaning
There are twenty hanja with the reading "jae" and eight hanja with the reading "seop" on the South Korean government's official list of hanja which may be registered for use in given names. Ways of writing this name in hanja include:
 (있을 재 isseul jae "to be present"; 건널 섭 geonneol seop "to cross a stream")
 (재목 재 jaemok jae "timber" or "talent"; 불꽃 섭 bulggot seop "blaze")

People
Han Jae-sup, South Korean national team volleyball player, silver medalist in volleyball at the 1962 Asian Games
Kang Jae-sup (born 1948), South Korean politician
Byun Jae-sub (born 1975), South Korean footballer

Fictional characters
Kang Jae-sup, one of the main characters in 2004 South Korean television series April Kiss
Jae-seop, supporting character in 2009 South Korean television series The Slingshot

See also
List of Korean given names

References

Korean masculine given names